The golden myna (Mino anais) is a species of starling in the family Sturnidae. It is found in New Guinea. Its natural habitat is subtropical or tropical moist lowland forest.

References

golden myna
golden myna
Taxonomy articles created by Polbot